The 12th Pan American Games were held in Mar del Plata, Argentina from March 11 to March 26, 1995.

Medals

Gold

Women's Recurve (70 m): Jacquelin Fernández

Men's 200 meters: Iván García
Men's 400 meters: Norberto Téllez
Men's High Jump: Javier Sotomayor
Men's Long Jump: Iván Pedroso
Men's Triple Jump: Yoelbi Quesada
Men's Discus: Roberto Moya
Men's Javelin: Emeterio González
Men's 4x100 meters: Joel Isasi, Jorge Aguilera, Joel Lamela, and Iván García
Men's 4x400 meters: Jorge Crusellas, Norberto Téllez, Omar Meña, and Iván García
Women's 200 meters: Liliana Allen
Women's 400 meters: Julia Duporty
Women's 100 m Hurdles: Aliuska López
Women's High Jump: Ioamnet Quintero
Women's Long Jump: Niurka Montalvo
Women's Triple Jump: Laiza Carrillo
Women's Discus: Maritza Martén
Women's Javelin: Xiomara Rivero
Women's 4x400 meters: Idalmis Bonne, Surella Morales, Nancy McLeón, and Julia Duporty

Men's Bantamweight (– 54 kg): Juan Despaigne
Men's Featherweight (– 57 kg): Arnaldo Mesa
Men's Lightweight (– 60 kg): Julio Gonzáles
Men's Light Middleweight (– 71 kg): Alfredo Duvergel
Men's Middleweight (– 75 kg): Ariel Hernández
Men's Heavyweight (– 91 kg): Félix Savón
Men's Super Heavyweight (+ 91 kg): Leonardo Martínez Fiz

Men's 1.000m Time Trial (Track): Gil Cordovés

Women's 1m Springboard: Mayte Garbey

Men's All-Around: Eric López 
Men's Floor Exercise: Damian Merino 
Men's Parallel Bars: Eric López 
Men's Pommel Horse: Eric López 
Men's Rings: Damian Merino

Men's Team Competition: Cuba men's national handball team

Men's Flyweight (– 56 kg): Ismady Alonso
Men's Featherweight (– 65 kg): Israel Hernández
Women's Flyweight (– 45 kg): Mirledis Turro
Women's Extra Lightweight (– 48 kg): Amarilis Savón
Women's Half Lightweight (– 52 kg): Legna Verdecia
Women's Lightweight (– 56 kg): Driulis González
Women's Half Middleweight (– 61 kg): Ileana Beltrán
Women's Middleweight (– 66 kg): Odalis Revé
Women's Half Heavyweight (– 72 kg): Diadenis Luna
Women's Heavyweight (+ 72 kg): Daima Beltrán

Men's Kumite (– 66 kg): Pablo Torres del Toro
Men's Kumite (– 72 kg): José Vilela
Men's Kumite (– 80 kg): Noel Hernández
Women's Kumite (– 53 kg): Vivian Sosa
Women's Kumite (Team): Cuba

Men's – 70 kg: Roberto Abreu
Men's – 76 kg: Arturo Utria
Men's + 83 kg: Nelson Saenz
Women's – 60 kg: Sonallis Mayan

Women's Team Competition: Cuba women's national volleyball team

Men's Flyweight (– 54 kg): Jesús Aparicio 
Men's Bantamweight (– 59 kg): William Vargas 
Men's Featherweight (– 64 kg): Idalberto Aranda 
Men's Lightweight (– 70 kg): Rafael Gómez 
Men's Lightweight (– 76 kg): Pablo Lara 
Men's Middle-Heavyweight (– 91 kg): Carlos Alexis Hernández 
Men's First-Heavyweight (– 99 kg): Alexander Fonseca 
Men's Super Heavyweight (+ 108 kg): Modesto Sánchez

Men's Freestyle (– 48 kg): Alexis Vila 
Men's Freestyle (– 74 kg): Alberto Rodríguez 
Men's Greco-Roman (– 52 kg): Raúl Francisco Martínez 
Men's Greco-Roman (– 62 kg): Juan Luis Marén 
Men's Greco-Roman (– 68 kg): Liubal Colas 
Men's Greco-Roman (– 74 kg): Filiberto Azcuy 
Men's Greco-Roman (– 82 kg): Alexei Banes 
Men's Greco-Roman (– 90 kg): Reynaldo Peña 
Men's Greco-Roman (– 100 kg): Héctor Milian

Silver

Women's Recurve Team: Cuba

Men's 100 meters: Joel Isasi
Men's 400 meters: Omar Meña
Men's 800 meters: Alain Miranda
Men's 110 m hurdles: Emilio Valle
Men's Long Jump: Jaime Jefferson
Men's Shot Put: Jorge Montenegro
Men's Discus: Alexis Elizalde
Men's Hammer: Alberto Sánchez
Men's Decathlon: Eugenio Balanqué
Women's 100 meters: Liliana Allen
Women's 400 meters: Nancy McLeón
Women's High Jump: Silvia Costa
Women's Triple Jump: Niurka Montalvo
Women's Discus: Bárbara Hechevarría
Women's Heptathlon: Magalys García
Women's 4x100 metres: Miriam Ferrer, Aliuska López, Liliana Allen, and Dainelky Pérez

Men's Light Flyweight (– 48 kg): Juan Ramírez
Men's Flyweight (– 51 kg): Raúl González

Men's 4.000m Team Pursuit (Track): Cuba
Women's 3.000m Individual Pursuit (Track): Yoanka González 
Women's Individual Time Trial (Road): Yacel Ojeda

Men's Parallel Bars: Lazaro Lamelas 
Men's Vault: Lazaro Lamelas 
Men's Team: Cuba 
Women's Beam: Annia Portuondo 
Women's Team: Cuba

Men's Bantamweight (– 60 kg): Manolo Poulot
Men's Lightweight (– 71 kg): Erick de la Paz
Men's Heavyweight (+ 95 kg): Frank Moreno

Men's Kumite (Open Class): Lazaro Montano

Men's 200 m Backstroke: Rodolfo Falcón

Women's – 43 kg: Yanet Puerto
Women's – 47 kg: Yunia Cruz
Women's – 65 kg: Lazara Zayas

Men's Light-Heavyweight (– 83 kg): Eduardo Moreno 
Men's Heavyweight (– 108 kg): Osvaldo Bango

Men's Freestyle (– 52 kg): Carlos Varela 
Men's Greco-Roman (– 57 kg): William Lara

Bronze

Men's Pole Vault: Alberto Manzano
Men's Triple Jump: Yoel García
Women's 100 m Hurdles: Odalys Adams
Women's 400 m Hurdles: Lency Montelier
Women's Shot Put: Yumileidi Cumbá

Men's Light Welterweight (– 63.5 kg): Héctor Vinent

Men's 1.000m Sprint (Track): Gil Cordovés 
Women's 3.000m Points Race (Track): Dania Pérez
Women's Individual Race (Road): Yacel Ojeda

Men's 1m Springboard: Abel Ramírez

Men's All-Around: Lazaro Lamelas 
Men's Rings: Eric López 
Women's Floor Exercise: Leyanet González 
Women's Uneven Bars: Annia Portuondo 
Women's Beam: Leyanet González 
Women's Vault: Annia Portuondo

Men's Light Heavyweight (– 95 kg): Belarmino Salgado

Men's 100 m Backstroke: Rodolfo Falcón

Men's – 50 kg: Reynaldo Ross
Men's – 54 kg: Alexei Pedroso
Men's – 64 kg: Ivens Valladares
Women's – 55 kg: Niuris Díaz
Women's + 70 kg: Yudelki Popo

Men's Team Competition: Cuba men's national volleyball team

Men's Freestyle (– 57 kg): Alejandro Puerto 
Men's Freestyle (– 62 kg): Carlos Julian Ortíz 
Men's Freestyle (– 68 kg): Jesús Eugenio Rodríguez 
Men's Freestyle (– 82 kg): Ariel Ramos 
Men's Freestyle (– 90 kg): Miguel Molina 
Men's Greco-Roman (– 48 kg): Wilber Sánchez

See also
 Cuba at the 1996 Summer Olympics

Nations at the 1995 Pan American Games
P
1995